Essex Street, known as Hackensack during the Erie Railroad era, is a New Jersey Transit rail station on the Pascack Valley Line, located in Hackensack, New Jersey, at 160 John Street. The Pascack Valley Line services this station seven days a week.

The first station house was built in 1861 by the Hackensack and New York Railroad on a track extension from Passaic Street in Hackensack. The station was turned over to the Erie Railroad in 1896, serving as a partial headquarters before being moved to Hillsdale and New Jersey Transit in 1983. The station was once the southernmost of four stations in Hackensack, which included stations at Anderson Street, Fairmount Avenue, and Central Avenue.

History

Hackensack and New York Railroad 

The original alignment of the Essex Street station dates back to the chartering of the Hackensack and New York Railroad in 1856 by David P. Patterson and other investors. Their intent in creating the rail line was to help maintain a steam-powered train line in the Pascack Valley and have future ambitions to build the system northward. Although Hackensack was not a large hub, there were several rail lines serving the city, including the New Jersey Midland Line (now the New York, Susquehanna and Western Railroad) with stops at Main Street (at the Mercer Street intersection) and at Prospect Avenue. During the 1860s, service was extended to north, terminating at the new Essex Street station. Although most Hackensack and New York trains ended at Passaic Street, service was extended northward on September 5, 1869, when that stop was abandoned in replacement for three brand new stops: Anderson Street, Fairmount Avenue and Central Avenue. By 1870, the tracks had been extended northward to Hillsdale, and public service began on the line on March 4 of that year. Trains terminated at Hillsdale with fare of only $0.75 (1870 USD), but just one year later, the service was extended northward to the community of Haverstraw, New York, and in 1896, the rail line was leased by the private company to the Erie Railroad.

Erie Railroad station and recent history 

After the leasing of the New Jersey and New York Railroad to the Erie Railroad, the history of Essex Street station remained rather quiet, with minor changes to the station building and site occurring over the next sixty years. Although the Hillsdale station served as headquarters for the New Jersey and New York Railroad, the headquarters was once located in the Essex Street station. During the Erie Railroad days, this was one of four stations in Hackensack, alongside Anderson Street, Central Avenue and Fairmount Avenue, but the station was not signed as such. Instead, the station was known as Hackensack station. There was a small parking lot behind the station, which had a large entranceway and large bay window. The 1893 station depot burned in 1970. In 1976, the Erie Lackawanna was combined with several other railroads to create the Consolidated Rail Corporation, who continued maintenance of the New Jersey and New York Line for the next seven years, until the newly formed New Jersey Transit took over the station in 1983. The station was also renamed to Essex Street in accordance with the number of stations. In 2002, during a long statewide construction of park and rides, the Essex Street station received thirty-six new parking spots for Hackensack as part of the New Jersey Transit "Back To Basics" strategy.

Station layout
Essex Street station is located at the intersection of Essex Street, Railroad Avenue and John Street in the city of Hackensack. The station has a lone platform on the southbound side for the one track heading through the station. There are two parking lots on either side of the station, with a large 186-space station on Essex Street behind the platform maintained by Park America. This lot has six handicap-accessible spaces and is free on evenings and weekends. The second lot, on the opposite side of the station, contains fifty spaces, also is maintained by Park America. However, this lot only has permit parking and contains no handicap-accessible spaces. The station also has bicycle lockers and one ticket vending machine (TVM) for commuter use. The station is also served by several New Jersey Transit buses: the 76, 144, 162, 164, 165, 178, 712, 772 and 780.

References

External links 

City of Hackensack website
 Station from Essex Street from Google Maps Street View

NJ Transit Rail Operations stations
Hackensack, New Jersey
Railway stations in the United States opened in 1861
Former Erie Railroad stations
1861 establishments in New Jersey